Washington School may refer to:

Argentina
Washington School, Buenos Aires, Argentina

United States
(sorted by state, then city/town)
 Washington School (Eureka, California), listed on the National Register of Historic Places (NRHP) in Humboldt County
 Washington School (New Britain, Connecticut), listed on the NRHP in Hartford County
 Washington School (Logansport, Indiana)
 Washington School (Taunton, Massachusetts), listed on the NRHP in Bristol County
 Washington School (Weymouth, Massachusetts), listed on the NRHP in Norfolk County
 Washington School (Mississippi), in Greenville, Mississippi
 Washington School (Monroe City, Missouri), listed on the NRHP in Monroe County
 Washington School (North Las Vegas, Nevada), listed on the NRHP in Clark County
 Washington School (Ossining, New York), listed on the NRHP in Westchester County
 Washington School (Grand Forks, North Dakota), listed on the NRHP in Grand Forks County
 Washington School (Washington Court House, Ohio), listed on the NRHP in Fayette County
 Washington School (Drumright, Oklahoma), listed on the NRHP in Creek County
 Washington School (Madison, South Dakota), listed on the NRHP in Lake County
 Washington School (Park City, Utah), listed on the NRHP in Summit County
 Washington School (Washington, Utah), listed on the NRHP in Washington County
 Washington School (Washington, Virginia) listed in NRHP in Rappahannock County
 Washington School (Tacoma, Washington), listed on the NRHP in Pierce County
 Washington School (Walla Walla, Washington), listed on the NRHP in Walla Walla County
 Washington School (Appleton, Wisconsin), listed on the NRHP in Outagamie County

See also

 Washington (disambiguation)
 Washington Academy (disambiguation)
 Washington School District (disambiguation)